The Santa Cruz white-eye (Zosterops sanctaecrucis) is a species of bird in the family Zosteropidae. It is endemic to the Solomon Islands.

References 

Santa Cruz white-eye
Birds of the Santa Cruz Islands
Santa Cruz white-eye
Taxa named by Henry Baker Tristram
Taxonomy articles created by Polbot